At-Tibhah is a sub-district located in the Shar'ab as-Salam District, Taiz Governorate, Yemen. At-Tibhah had a population of 3,247 according to the 2004 census.

Villages
al-Mhazalin village.
al-Madahif village.
al-Qal'ah village.
al-Ma'atibah village.
al-Tibhah village.

References

Sub-districts in Shar'ab as-Salam District